Euthalia strephon  is a butterfly of the family Nymphalidae (Limenitidinae). It is endemic to China.

References

strephon
Butterflies described in 1893